John Virley (fl. 1309–1311) was an English politician.

He was a Member (MP) of the Parliament of England for New Shoreham in 1309 and 1311.

References

13th-century births
14th-century deaths
English MPs 1308–09
English MPs 1311